Josef Goubeau (31 March 1901 in Augsburg, Germany – 18 October 1990 in Stuttgart) was a German chemist.

Life and work 
Goubeau studied chemistry at the University of Munich starting from 1921 and attained a doctorate there 1926 on the atomic weight regulation of the potassiumin the group of Otto Hönigschmid under the supervision of Eduard Zintl. Subsequently, he worked at the University of Freiburg, the mountain academy Clausthal-Zellerfeld, where he made his postdoctoral lecture qualification in 1935 on the Raman effect in analytical chemistry.  Starting from 1940 he became a university teacher at the University of Göttingen, and since 1951 professor at the technical University of Stuttgart. His focus of activity was the inorganic synthetic chemistry and spectroscopy of compounds of boron, silicon and phosphorus. Most important was his fundamental work about vibrational spectroscopy and to force constants as measure of the strength of chemical bonds.

Honours 
 Doctor HC of the Universities of Clausthal and Munich
 Alfred Stock Memorial Prize of the Society of German Chemists
Member of the Academy of Sciences Leopoldina

External links
 Biographic note of the University of Stuttgart

References 

19th-century German chemists
Ludwig Maximilian University of Munich alumni
University of Freiburg alumni
Academic staff of the University of Göttingen
Academic staff of the University of Stuttgart
1901 births
1990 deaths
Scientists from Augsburg